Altiplano is a 2009 Peruvian-Belgian drama film by Peter Brosens and Jessica Woodworth starring Magaly Solier, Jasmin Tabatabai, and Olivier Gourmet. It takes places on three continents in five different languages. It tells the stories of two women in mourning and how their destinies merge.

Plot summary
Photographer Grace is devastated after being forced to take a picture of the killing of her guide in Iraq. Back in Belgium, she withdraws the picture after it had already been nominated for the Pulitzer Prize. Her husband Max is an oculist and leaves to work at an eye clinic in the Andes in Peru. A local mine spills mercury, causing many people of the nearby village of Turubamba to succumb to illness. Max and his fellow physicians suspect toxins to be the reason for the affliction. They decide to collect more data in Turubamba.

Meanwhile, Saturnina, a young woman from the village loses her fiancé to the contamination. Upon the physicians' arrival, Saturnina's fiancé's mother angrily rejects the doctors' request to examine the body. The villagers turn their rage on the doctors and stone Max to death. Saturnina leads an unsuccessful demonstration against the mine's truck drivers. After the mine's closure, Saturnina commits suicide by drinking mercury and films her death on the camera Max had dropped when he was killed.

Grace sets out on a journey to the place of Max's death. Saturnina's mother welcomes her and offers hospitality. Grace watches the video made by Saturnina. In the end, she partakes in Saturnina's funeral and finally ends her mourning over her husband.

Cast
 Magaly Solier as Saturnina
 Jasmin Tabatabai as Grace
 Olivier Gourmet as Max
 Behi Djanati Ataï as Sami
 Edgar Condori as Nilo/Omar
 Sonia Loaiza as mother
 Edgar Quispe as Ignacio
 Norma Martinez as female doctor
 Rodolfo Rodríguez as Raúl

Production
Shooting took place on locations in Belgium and Peru for 43 days between June and October 2008. Due to extreme weather conditions at an altitude of 5,000 metres in the Peruvian Andes, the crew and cast had access to a medical team 24 hours a day.

Although the film is fictional, it is inspired by true events that took place in the year 2000 in a Peruvian village of Choropampa District. Furthermore, some characters like Saturnina and Max are also based on reports and anecdotes of local villagers and foreign doctors.

Reception and awards
The film has garnered mainly positive responses.  It has also won a number of independent film awards:

 Bangkok International Film Festival 2009:  Special Golden Kinnaree Award for Environmental Awareness
 Festival Film Europeen de Virton 2009: Prize of the City Virton
 Lucania Film Festival 2010: Best Feature Film 
 Festival de Cinema de Avanca 2010: Best Feature Film 
 Festival de Cinema de Avanca 2010: Best Actress for Magaly Solier
 International Film Festival Tofifest 2010: Special Jury Award 
Altiplano was nominated for two Magritte Awards in the category of Best Film in Coproduction and Best Costume Design for Christophe Pidre and Florence Scholtes in 2011.

References

External links
 Official website
 
 
 Website of distributor Farbfilm Verleih (German)
 Tabatabai's website

,

Peruvian drama films
Belgian drama films
2009 films
Environmental films
2000s Spanish-language films
2000s Peruvian films
Quechua-language films
2000s French-language films
2000s English-language films
2000s Persian-language films
First Run Features films
2009 multilingual films
Belgian multilingual films